Wesfarmers Limited is an Australian conglomerate, headquartered in Perth, Western Australia. It has interests predominantly in Australia and New Zealand, operating in retail, chemical, fertiliser, industrial and safety products. With revenue of A$30.8 billion in the 2020 financial year, it is one of Australia's largest companies by revenue. Wesfarmers is also one of the largest private employers in Australia, with approximately 107,000 employees.

Wesfarmers was founded in 1914 as a co-operative to provide services and merchandise to Western Australian farmers. It was listed on the Australian Securities Exchange in 1984 and grew into a major retail conglomerate.

History

Westralian Farmers Co‐operative Limited was formed in 1914 as a cooperative company by the Farmers' and Settlers' Association of Western Australia, to acquire the assets of the West Australian Producers' Union, to be focused on the provision of services and merchandise to the Western Australian rural community. By 1919, more than 65 local co-operative companies were acting as agents for Westralian Farmers Limited.

In 1924, it established the first public radio station in Western Australia with 6WF, before it passed into the hands of the Australian Broadcasting Commission in 1929, now called ABC Radio Perth

By the 1940s, the company's business included "being wheat and general merchants; country distribution for Commonwealth Oil Refineries; wool, livestock, skin and produce auctioneers; grain & fruit exporters; insurance underwriters; acquiring agents for the wheat pool of W.A." Known as Westralian Farmers Limited, it had premises in various locations within the Perth central business district. In the 1940s there were premises at 563-571 Wellington Street. It also had premises in Newman Street in Fremantle.

In 1949, Wesfarmers acquired Ashburton Transport, which at the time was lossmaking. The following year it also acquired its major competitor Gascoyne Trading, combining the operations of the two companies to supply the northwest of Western Australia. Along with wool and mail, it carted bananas from Carnarvon to Perth, returning with stores and mail from Perth. Gascoyne Trading introduced refrigerated transport to the region and three trailer road trains that now carry loads up to 115 tonnes.

In 1984, Westralian Farmers Co-operative Limited formed Wesfarmers Limited, restructuring from a co-operative to a public company and listed on the Australian Securities Exchange on 15 November 1984. Initially the Co-operative retained 60% of the ordinary shares, guaranteeing that the co-op's farmer members retained control, and the rest was distributed to its members.

In 1991, 19 m3 of the records of Westralian Farmers Co-operative were deposited with the J S Battye Library in Perth.

Rural business, Dalgety Farmers and Wesfarmers Landmark
Bought in January 1993 the integration of Dalgety Farmers with Wesfarmers proved more difficult than expected. For a time the merged rural agency and merchandise business was Wesfarmers Dalgety until renamed Wesfarmers Landmark in March 2001 after IAMA Limited was brought in. Landmark, Wesfarmers foundation business, was sold to AWB Limited (originally the Australia Wheat Board) in August 2003.

Bunnings
An initial investment in 10 percent of Bunnings in February 1987 reached full ownership in January 1994. Bunnings bought UK retailer Homebase in February 2016 and Britain's first Bunnings store opened twelve months later in February 2017. They were 265 well-located stores and Wesfarmers believed Bunnings' management would greatly improve their modest profits. The plan was to make changes gently but tactics changed and local management, perceived as under-performing, was removed and replaced by expatriate management. The expatriate management's changes alienated the existing customer base and, aided by a poor retailing climate, brought a rapid decline into losses. A strategic review by Wesfarmers resulted in the May 2018 sale of the Homebase business to Hilco Capital at a loss of (Australian) $1.96 billion.

Australian Railroad Group
Australian Railroad Group begun in a joint venture with Genesee & Wyoming by the purchase of Westrail at the beginning of 2000. It was sold in 2006 to Babcock & Brown and Queensland Rail.

End of co-operative ownership
In 2001, Wesfarmers become a freely-traded publicly listed company with open ownership. After becoming a public company, Wesfarmers diversified its interests by acquiring other businesses.

Divisions

Home improvement and office supplies
This division is made up of Bunnings Warehouse, a retailer of home improvement and outdoor living products, servicing home and commercial customers in Australia and New Zealand, and Officeworks, a retailer and supplier of office products for home, business and education in Australia. There are 210 Bunnings "warehouse" (larger) stores, 67 Bunnings small-format stores, 36 Bunnings Trade centres and 150 Officeworks stores. Bunnings employs more than 33,000 staff and Officeworks employs more than 8,000 staff.

In January 2016, Home Retail Group accepted an offer from Wesfarmers to acquire the British home improvement retailer and garden centre Homebase. Stores in the United Kingdom and Ireland began to be rebranded as Bunnings following the takeover. However, following Wesfarmer's sale of Homebase to Hilco in May 2018, it was reported that the 24 stores already converted would return to the "Homebase" branding.

In 2019, Officeworks group acquired Geeks2U, an Australian provider of on-site information, communication and technology services.

Kmart Group
In February 2016, Wesfarmers announced a restructure of its department store businesses into a single division named Department Stores, with each brand (originally Kmart and Target) continuing to operate independently. The division was later renamed Kmart Group. In August 2019, Catch Group, operator of the online shopping website catch.com.au, was acquired by Wesfarmers and included in the group.

Kmart
Kmart is a discount department store retailer in Australia and New Zealand.  Kmart has more than 300 stores around Australia and New Zealand, employing more than 42,000 staff. Kmart Tyre and Auto is no longer a part of Kmart after parent Wesfarmers sold the auto division to German company Continental AG. Kmart Tyre and Auto has since been rebranded by Continental AG to MyCar.

Target
Target is a mid-level department store retailer in Australia. Target employs more than 12,000 staff. In 2014, Wesfarmers was forced to write-down the value of Target by $680 million because of a fall in the company's profits. Target Australia has no connection to the American retailer Target of similar name.

Industrials
In August 2015, Wesfarmers announced an organisational restructure to cluster its three industrial businesses, Chemicals, Energy & Fertilisers (WesCEF); Resources; and Industrial and Safety (WIS) into a single, new Industrials division.

Wesfarmers Chemicals, Energy & Fertilisers
Wesfarmers Chemicals, Energy & Fertilisers (WesCEF) produces and markets chemicals, fertilisers and gas products. WesCEF has ammonia and ammonium nitrate production facilities in Western Australia, 50% of QNP ammonium nitrate production facilities in Queensland, sodium cyanide production facilities in Western Australia, PVC resin and specialty chemicals production facilities in Victoria, LPG and LNG distribution across Australia with LPG and LNG production facilities in Western Australia and fertiliser production and importation facilities in Western Australia. WesCEF employs more than 1,200 staff. WesCEF businesses include CSBP, Australian Vinyls, AGR, QNP, Evol LNG, Kleenheat and Modwood.

Wesfarmers Industrial and Safety

Wesfarmers Industrial and Safety provides industrial and safety products and services in Australia and New Zealand. On 1 December 2014, Wesfamers Industrial and Safety completed the acquisition of the Workwear Group of Pacific Brands Limited. Its businesses now include Blackwoods, Greencap, Bullivants, Coregas, Blackwoods Protector, Safety Source, Total Fasteners, Packaging House, King Gee, Hard Yakka, Stubbies and GotStock.

The division's 32 New Zealand stores are now all branded as NZ Safety Blackwoods. These include former Blackwood and Packaging House stores, and 19 former Paykel Engineering Supplies purchased in 2003.

Australian Pharmaceutical Industries 
Wesfarmers is one step closer in acquiring Australian Pharmaceutical Industries (API) after the shareholder approval on 17th March 2022.

API would form the basis of a new healthcare division of Wesfarmers and a base from which to invest and develop capabilities in the health and wellbeing sector

Other activities
Wesfarmers has a 50% interest in investment house Gresham Partners plus interests in Gresham Private Equity Funds, 50% interest in Wespine, a plantation softwood sawmill in Dardanup and a 24% interest in BWP Trust which mainly owns Bunnings Warehouses tenanted by Bunnings Group Limited.

Wesfarmers owns the online retailer Catch.com.au

Other businesses
Wesfarmers has 100% interest in many other subsidiaries across Australia, New Zealand, India, New Caledonia, United Kingdom, Hong Kong, Indonesia, China, Bermuda and Singapore. These include BBC Hardware, Coles Ansett Travel, Coles Group Superannuation Fund, Coles Property Management, Comnet, Fosseys, Grocery Holdings Pty Ltd, Harris Technology, Howard Smith, Katies Fashions, Loyalty Pacific, Masters Home Improvement New Zealand, Morley Shopping Centre, now.com.au, Theo's Liquor, Tooronga Shopping Centre, Tyremaster, Viking Direct and World 4 Kids.

Former interests

Insurance
On 16 June 2014, Wesfarmers completed the sale of its insurance broking and premium funding operations, including OAMPS Insurance Brokers in Australia, OAMPS UK, Crombie Lockwood in New Zealand, Lumley Finance and Monument Premium Financing to Arthur J. Gallagher & Co. On 30 June 2014, Wesfarmers completed the sale of its insurance underwriting operations, including the WFI and Lumley brands, to the Insurance Australia Group.

Coles
On 2 July 2007, Wesfarmers announced it was purchasing the Coles Group retail business for $22 billion making it the largest successful take-over in Australian corporate history. Wesfarmers took control of Coles on 23 November 2007, after paying almost $20 billion for the company. Wesfarmers had already purchased 13 per cent of the retailer in April.

Coles is a national supermarket, liquor, fuel and convenience retailer in Australia. As of September 2013, Coles operated 756 full-service supermarkets, 810 liquor outlets, 92 hotels, and 636 fuel and convenience stores. Coles employs more than 105,000 staff. Coles' businesses include Coles Supermarkets, Coles Online, Coles Express, Vintage Cellars, 1st Choice Liquor Superstore, BI-LO, Coles Financial Services and Liquorland.

On 16 March 2018, Wesfarmers held a meeting to discuss its intention to demerge Coles, The demerger was effective from 21 November 2018 with Wesfarmers retaining a 15% shareholding. During 2020 Wesfarmers reduced its equity in Coles to 4.9%.

Wesfarmers Resources
Wesfarmers Resources owned and operated open-cut coal producing resources in Australia including the Curragh in Queensland. Wesfarmers divested its coal business, completing the process with the sale of its 40 per cent interest in the Bengalla Joint Venture to New Hope Corporation for $860 million on 3 December 2018.

Wesfarmers Transport
In 1950 Wesfarmers purchased the Gascoyne Trading Company (GTC), growing it to become the largest transport operator in Western Australia. Until 1971 it held the sole rights for direct road transport between Carnarvon and Perth. In 1973 a joint venture was formed with Downard to enter the interstate freight forwarding market between Western Australia and Victoria.

In 1985, GTC purchased a 50% shareholding in Total West from Mayne Nickless. In 1996, after taking full ownership of Total West, Wesfarmers merged it with GTC to form Wesfarmers Transport. In 2001 the business was sold to Toll Holdings.

Company executives
Chairmen
1914–1916: Deane Hammond
1916–1921: Matthew Padbury
1921–1953: Walter Harper
1953–1965: Ernest Thorley Loton
1965–1975: Walter Crosse
1975–1982: Maurice Clayton
1983–1986: Marcus Beeck
1986–2002: Harry Perkins
2002–2008: Trevor Eastwood
2008–2015: Bob Every
2015–present: Michael Chaney

Chief executives / general managers / managing directors
1917–1925: Basil Murray
1925–1957: John Thomson
1958–1973: Keith Edwards
1974–1984: John Bennison
1984–1992: Trevor Eastwood
1992–2005: Michael Chaney
2005–2017: Richard Goyder
2017–present: Rob Scott

References

Further reading
 Smith, Kevin P.(1984) A bunch of pirates: the story of a farmer co-operative: Wesfarmers Perth, W.A : Westralian Farmers Co-operative. 
 (2003) 50 years of powering Western Australia : from Western Colleries to Wesfarmers Coal. Collie, W.A.: Wesfarmers Premier Coal.
 Thompson, Peter (2014) Wesfarmers 100: The People's Story 1914-2014 Perth, W.A.

External links
 Wesfarmers Limited
      

 
Conglomerate companies of Australia
Companies listed on the Australian Securities Exchange
Australian brands
Companies based in Perth, Western Australia
Australian stock and station agencies
Retail companies established in 1914
Conglomerate companies established in 1914
History of Western Australia
Agriculture companies established in 1914
Australian companies established in 1914